Alhaz Jamirun Noor High School is a public secondary school in Sunamganj Sadar Upazila, Sunamganj District, Bangladesh. It was established in 1990 by Alhaz Abdur noor Talukder.
It is situated in Janigoan. The school consists of three main buildings. There is one playground inside the school compound.

References

External links
 Bangla Medium School
 Secondary Schools In Bangladesh

High schools in Bangladesh